The Roman Catholic Diocese of Río Gallegos is located in the city of Río Gallegos, the capital of the Patagonia region of Santa Cruz, Argentina.

Size
The Diocese of Rio Gallegos, Argentina, according to the Vatican Information Service (VIS), has an area of 265,614 square miles, a total population of 300,000, a Catholic population of 210,000, 55 priests, 9 permanent deacons, and 94 religious.

History
It was erected in 1961, and was formed from the Diocese of Comodoro Rivadavia, Argentina. It is a suffragan see of the Archdiocese of Bahia Blanca, Argentina.

Bishops

Ordinaries

 , S.D.B.(1961–1974)
 Miguel Angel Alemán Eslava, S.D.B.(1975–1992)
 Alejandro Antonio Buccolini, S.D.B. (1992–2005)
 Juan Carlos Romanin, S.D.B. (2005–2012)
 Miguel Ángel D’Annibale (2013–2018), appointed Bishop of San Martín
  (2019-)

Auxiliary bishop
 Miguel Ángel D’Annibale (2011-2013), appointed Bishop here

References

External links 
 

Rio Gallegos
Rio Gallegos
Rio Gallegos
Rio Gallegos
1961 establishments in Argentina